Aliabad-e Jahr (also Romanized as ’Alīābād-e Jahr; also known as ‘Alīābād-e Jar) is a village in Zangiabad Rural District, in the Central District of Kerman County, Kerman Province, Iran. At the 2006 census, its population was 44, in 6 families.

References 

Populated places in Kerman County